The 1984–85 Auburn Tigers men's basketball team represented Auburn University in the 1984–85 college basketball season. The team's head coach was Sonny Smith, who was in his seventh season at Auburn.

Smith and the Tigers had to deal with the losses of center Charles Barkley (left for NBA) and forward Greg Turner (graduated).  However, a stellar recruiting class of five freshman, including forward Chris Morris, centers Jeff Moore and Darren Guest, and guards Johnny Lynn and Terrence Howard joined holdovers Chuck Person, Gerald White, and Frank Ford and matured and improved as the season progressed.  The team played their home games at Memorial Coliseum in Auburn, Alabama.

The Tigers finished the season 22–12, 8–10 in SEC play. They defeated Ole Miss, LSU, Florida, and Alabama to win the SEC tournament championship. They received an automatic bid to the NCAA tournament where they defeated Purdue and Kansas to advance to the Sweet Sixteen where they lost to North Carolina.

Roster

Schedule and results

|-
!colspan=12 style=| Regular season
|-

|-
!colspan=12 style=| SEC Tournament

|-
!colspan=12 style=| NCAA Tournament

Sources

References

Auburn Tigers men's basketball seasons
Auburn
Auburn
Auburn Tigers
Auburn Tigers